The jazz musician John Birks "Dizzy" Gillespie campaigned as an independent write-in candidate during the 1964 United States presidential campaign.

He promised that if he were elected, the White House would be renamed the Blues House, and he would have a cabinet composed of Duke Ellington (Secretary of State), Miles Davis (Director of the CIA), Max Roach (Secretary of Defense), Charles Mingus (Secretary of Peace), Ray Charles (Librarian of Congress), Louis Armstrong (Secretary of Agriculture), Mary Lou Williams (Ambassador to the Vatican), Thelonious Monk (Travelling Ambassador) and Malcolm X (Attorney General). He said his running mate would be Phyllis Diller. Gillespie pledged to provide housing and hospital care for all those who needed it and to withdraw American troops from the Vietnam War. Gillespie said that his campaign was not just a publicity stunt but was intended "to take advantage of the votes and publicity I'd receive and to promote change".

Campaign buttons had been manufactured years before by Gillespie's booking agency as a joke but proceeds went to Congress of Racial Equality and the Southern Christian Leadership Conference headed by Martin Luther King Jr.; in later years they became a collector's item.

When asked why he was running for the presidency, Gillespie replied "Because we need one", this became the slogan for his campaign. Gillespie's campaign was managed by the jazz critic Ralph Gleason and his wife.

Gillespie's supporters founded the John Birks Society, named for Gillespie's first two names and coined as an obvious rebuke to the right wing John Birch Society. Members of the John Birks Society were encouraged to write to the Secretary of State of California to accept Gillespie as an independent candidate for the presidency. Supporters from an initial twenty five states had expressed an interest in supporting Gillespie but it was decided to focus attention on California.

Gillespie's campaign song was a rewrite of "Salt Peanuts" with lyrics reflecting the campaign.

Gillespie eventually withdrew from the race. The eventual election was won by the incumbent President, the Democrat Lyndon Johnson.  In 1971, he announced he would run again but withdrew before the election. Ramona Crowell, a member of the Sioux tribe, was chosen by Gillespie as his vice president.

A 2004 play about Gillespie's campaign, Vote Dizzy!, by Jack Brooder, was staged in London, England, during that year's American presidential election.

References

Gillespie, Dizzy